Texas Roadhouse is an American steakhouse chain that specializes in steaks in a Texan and Southwestern cuisine style. It is a subsidiary of Texas Roadhouse Inc, which has two other concepts (Bubba's 33 and Jaggers) and is headquartered in Louisville, Kentucky. As of August 2021, the chain operates about 627 locations in 49 U.S. states and 29 international locations in 10 countries.

History
Texas Roadhouse was founded on February 17, 1993, at the Green Tree Mall in Clarksville, Indiana, across the Ohio River from Louisville, Kentucky. Founder W. Kent Taylor, a Louisville native, lived in Colorado and worked at nightclubs and restaurants there. In 1990, Taylor returned to his hometown of Louisville, Kentucky. He began work as a Kentucky Fried Chicken manager and had dreams to open a Colorado-themed restaurant. Former Kentucky Governor John Y. Brown, Jr. helped Taylor fulfill his dream by backing him with $80,000. In 1991, Taylor opened Buckhead Mountain Grill. Taylor was his own executive chef. Brown invested more money and wanted to open a second store in Clarksville, but complications in the partnership caused it to fall apart.

Brown had elected to pursue another steak concept without Taylor, leaving Taylor with the decision to either stay committed to Buckhead or attempt to start a new business. He decided to go with the latter; however, he had trouble finding investors to help him launch the new concept. Taylor was turned down by many potential investors. Finally, Taylor met a potential investor while he was managing at Buckhead. Dr. John Rhodes became interested in Taylor's proposition of the new steak restaurant concept that Taylor showed to him through drawings on loose papers and cocktail napkins. Taylor was able to convince Dr. Rhodes and two of his colleagues to invest $100,000 each in 1992. A year later in 1993, the first Texas Roadhouse in Clarksville, Indiana opened its doors. In 1994, Taylor sold his shares in Buckhead Mountain Grill to focus solely on Texas Roadhouse.

In 1993, the second Texas Roadhouse opened in Gainesville, Florida. In 1994, three additional restaurants opened in Cincinnati; Ohio, Clearwater, Florida; and Sarasota, Florida. These three locations would all close because of poor building locations. Kent Taylor was forced to decide how to continue the success of the first two restaurants in Clarksville and Gainesville while dealing with the failures of the three new stores. Taylor decided that better in-store training, building designs, and restaurant decor would help improve Roadhouse's growth. Taylor hired a promising chef who worked in Louisville, Kentucky, Jim Broyles. Broyles was hired as the Director of Food and Beverages and transformed the way Roadhouse prepared and served food. The chain expanded rapidly in the late 1990s, and by the end of 1999, 67 restaurants had been opened. In 2004, Roadhouse became a public company. In September 2011, Texas Roadhouse started their international expansion with the first international location in Dubai in the United Arab Emirates. During the COVID-19 Pandemic in 2020, Taylor donated his entire salary and bonus, totaling over $800,000, to his employees during the pandemic. 

After struggling with unbearable tinnitus, Taylor died by suicide on March 18, 2021, at the age of 65. It was announced that Jerry Morgan would take over the role of president and CEO.

Taylor posthumously published his memoir, Made From Scratch: The Legendary Success Story of Texas Roadhouse.

Operations and marketing

Texas Roadhouse's mission statement is "Legendary Food, Legendary Service". Their mascot is an armadillo named Andy. The company's restaurants offer entertainment in the form of line dancing. The waiters, waitresses and hosts perform these dances throughout the night.  The employees participate in intercompany competitions: bartenders compete in "The Real Bar" competition, and meat cutters in the annual "Meat Hero Competition". 

The Roadhouse Corporation supports the homebuilding programs Habitat for Humanity International and Homes For Our Troops. The company also sponsors a road cycling team of about 20 cyclists. Texas Roadhouse is a major supporter of Special Olympics.

Each restaurant had a table called "Willie's Corner", with pictures and memorabilia of Willie Nelson. In 2002, Nelson signed a deal to become an official partner of Texas Roadhouse.  Since then, Nelson has heavily promoted the chain, including a special on Food Network. Willie Nelson is the owner of the Texas Roadhouse in South Austin, TX.

Cuisine
Texas Roadhouse serves Texan and American cuisine, including steak, ribs, chicken, and seafood.

See also
 Aspen Creek Grill, restaurant chain formerly owned by Texas Roadhouse

References

External links
 

1993 establishments in Indiana
American companies established in 1993
Clarksville, Indiana
Companies based in Louisville, Kentucky
Companies listed on the Nasdaq
Restaurant chains in the United States
Restaurants established in 1993
Steakhouses in the United States
Western-themed restaurants